The site of  in Urahoro, Hokkaidō, Japan, is that once occupied by the Ainu fortified chashi of Otafunbe. It has been designated a national Historic Site. The name combines the Ainu for "sand" (ota) with that for "whale" (funbe or humbe).

The chashi features in the historical record, and legends about the place have been handed down: in days of yore, the Akkeshi Ainu attacked the Shiranuka Ainu, who held out in the chashi. Unable to prevail, in the middle of the night, the Akkeshi Ainu formed a whale from the sand, and lay low behind. At daybreak, the Shiranuka Ainu approached this offered-up whale, whereupon the Akkeshi Ainu sprung upon them. When the Akkeshi Ainu subsequently boarded their boats and were rowing out, a swarm of bees such as had never before been seen flew forth from where the dead were buried, and the greater part of them were stung to death.

See also
 List of Historic Sites of Japan (Hokkaidō)
 List of Cultural Properties of Japan - archaeological materials (Hokkaidō)
 Yukuepira Chashi
 Trojan Horse
 Aetiology

References

History of Hokkaido
Archaeological sites in Japan
Chashi